Kasatkin (from касатка meaning killer whale , swallow or small bird) is a Russian masculine surname, its feminine counterpart is Kasatkina.  An American variant is Kassatkin.  It may refer to:

Anton Kasatkin, a Russian soccer player, FC Luch-Energia Vladivostok
Daria Kasatkina (born 1997), Russian tennis player
Lyudmila Kasatkina (1925–2012), Russian actress
Nikolay Kasatkin (1859–1930), a Russian/Soviet painter
Nicholas of Japan, born Ivan Kasatkin (1836–1912), a Russian Orthodox priest, monk, and saint 
Tatyana Kasatkina (born 1963), a Russian philosopher, philologist, culture expert, religious scholar and writer
Vasily Kasatkin, a rector of the Moscow State University in 1930–1934

Russian-language surnames